USee4Yourself (stylized in all caps) is the second studio album by American rapper IDK. It was released on July 9, 2021, through Clue No Clue and Warner Records.

USee4Yourself received positive reviews from critics. At Metacritic, which assigns a normalized rating out of 100 to reviews from professional publications, the album received an average score of 79, based on 5 reviews.

Background 
IDK stated, "I needed to make this album to become a better person", and expressed during the process, "took away a sense of fear... of people finding out who I am".

Track listing

References 

2021 albums
Warner Records albums
Hip hop albums by American artists
Albums produced by the Neptunes
Albums produced by T-Minus (record producer)